Chrysolina is a large genus of leaf beetles in the subfamily Chrysomelinae. Most species are distributed in Europe, Asia and Africa with a small number of species inhabiting North America (including introduced European ones) and introduced species in Australia.

The species Chrysolina cerealis and C. graminis are protected in the United Kingdom. All species of Chrysolina are phytophagous, feeding on specific food plants, and some of them have been used for biological control of weeds. To control Hypericum perforatum (St John's wort), C. hyperici was successfully naturalized in Australia in the 1930s and several species, especially C. quadrigemina, were introduced to California in the late 1940s.

Systematic classification of European species
Order Coleoptera
Suborder Polyphaga
Superfamily Chrysomeloidea Latreille, 1802
Family Chrysomelidae Latreille, 1802
Subfamily Chrysomelinae Latreille, 1802
Genus Chrysolina Motschulsky, 1860
Subgenus Allochrysolina
Chrysolina fuliginosa (Olivier, 1807)
Chrysolina lepida (Olivier 1807)
Subgenus Anopachys
Chrysolina aurichalcea (Mannerheim, 1825)
Chrysolina eurina (Frivaldszky, 1883)
Chrysolina relucens (Rosenhauer, 1847)
Chrysolina schatzmayri (Muller, 1916)
Subgenus Arctolina
Chrysolina septentrionalis (Menetries, 1851)
Subgenus Bechynia
Chrysolina milleri (Weise, 1884)
Chrysolina philotesia Daccordi & Ruffo, 1980
Chrysolina platypoda (Bechyné, 1950)
Chrysolina substrangulata Bourdonne, 1986
Subgenus Bittotaenia
Chrysolina salviae (Germar, 1824)
Subgenus Cecchiniola
Chrysolina platyscelidina (Jacobson, 1898)
Subgenus Centoptera
Chrysolina bicolor (Fabricius, 1775)
Subgenus Chalcoidea
Chrysolina analis (Linnaeus, 1767)
Chrysolina carnifex melanaria (Suffrian, 1851)
Chrysolina carnifex (Fabricius, 1792)
Chrysolina cinctipennis (Harold, 1874)
Chrysolina curvilinea (Weise, 1884)
Chrysolina hyrcana (Weise, 1884)
Chrysolina interstincta (Suffrian, 1851)
Chrysolina marginata (Linnaeus, 1758)
Chrysolina taygetana Bechyné, 1952
Subgenus Chrysolina
Chrysolina bankii (Fabricius, 1775)
Chrysolina costalis (Olivier, 1807)
Chrysolina fortunata (Wollaston, 1864)
Chrysolina obsoleta (Brulle, 1838)
Chrysolina rufa (Duftschmid, 1825)
Chrysolina staphylaea (Linnaeus, 1758)
Chrysolina wollastoni Bechyné, 1957
Subgenus Chrysomorpha
Chrysolina cerealis (Linnaeus, 1767)
Subgenus Colaphodes
Chrysolina haemoptera (Linnaeus, 1758)
Subgenus Colaphoptera
Chrysolina globosa (Panzer, 1805)
Chrysolina pliginskii (Reitter, 1913)
Chrysolina purpurascens (Germar, 1822)
Subgenus Colaphosoma
Chrysolina sturmi (Westhoff, 1882)
Subgenus Craspeda
Chrysolina jenisseiensis (Breit, 1920)
Chrysolina limbata (Fabricius, 1775)
Subgenus Cyrtochrysolina
Chrysolina marcasitica (Germar, 1824)
Subgenus Erythrochrysa
Chrysolina polita (Linnaeus, 1758)
Subgenus Euchrysolina
Chrysolina graminis (Linnaeus, 1758)
Chrysolina virgata (Motschulsky, 1860)
Subgenus Fastuolina
Chrysolina fastuosa (Scopoli, 1763)
Subgenus Heliostola
Chrysolina carpathica (Fuss, 1856)
Chrysolina lichenis (Richter, 1820)
Chrysolina schneideri (Weise, 1882)
Subgenus Hypericia
Chrysolina brunsvicensis (Gravenhorst, 1807)
Chrysolina corcyria (Suffrian, 1851)
Chrysolina cuprina (Duftschmid, 1825)
Chrysolina didymata (Scriba, 1791)
Chrysolina geminata (Paykull, 1799)
Chrysolina hyperici (Forster, 1771)
Chrysolina quadrigemina (Suffrian, 1851)
Subgenus Maenadochrysa
Chrysolina affinis (Fabricius, 1787)
Chrysolina aveyronenesis Bechyné, 1950
Chrysolina baetica (Suffrian, 1851)
Chrysolina femoralis (Olivier, 1790)
Subgenus Melasomoptera
Chrysolina grossa (Fabricius, 1792)
Chrysolina lucida (Olivier, 1807)
Chrysolina lutea (Petagna, 1819)
Subgenus Mimophaedon
Chrysolina pourtoyi Bourdonne, 1996
Subgenus Ovosoma
Chrysolina atrovirens (Frivaldszky, 1876)
Chrysolina cretica (Olivier, 1807)
Chrysolina halysa Bechyné, 1950
Chrysolina orientalis (Olivier, 1807)
Chrysolina rhodia Bechyné, 1950
Chrysolina sahlbergi (Menetries, 1832)
Chrysolina susterai Bechyné, 1950
Chrysolina turca (Fairmaire, 1865)
Chrysolina vernalis (Brulle, 1832)
Subgenus Ovostoma
Chrysolina globipennis (Suffrian, 1851)
Chrysolina olivieri (Bedel, 1892)
Subgenus Palaeosticta
Chrysolina diluta (Germar, 1824)
Subgenus Rhyssoloma
Chrysolina fragariae (Wollaston, 1854)
Subgenus Sphaerochrysolina
Chrysolina umbratilis (Weise, 1887)
Subgenus Sphaeromela
Chrysolina varians (Schaller, 1783)
Subgenus Stichoptera
Chrysolina colasi (Cobos, 1952)
Chrysolina grancanariensis (Lindberg, 1953)
Chrysolina gypsophilae (Kuster, 1845)
Chrysolina latecincta (Demaison, 1896)
Chrysolina kuesteri (Helliesen, 1912)
Chrysolina lucidicollis (Kuster, 1845)
Chrysolina mactata (Fairmaire, 1859)
Chrysolina rossia (Illiger, 1802)
Chrysolina sanguinolenta (Linnaeus, 1758)
Chrysolina stachydis (Gene, 1839)
Chrysolina variolosa (Petagna, 1819)
Subgenus Sulcicollis
Chrysolina chalcites (Germar, 1824)
Chrysolina oricalcia (Muller O. F., 1776)
Chrysolina peregrina (Herrich-Schaeffer, 1839)
Chrysolina rufoaenea (Suffrian, 1851)
Subgenus Synerga
Chrysolina coerulans (Scriba, 1791)
Chrysolina herbacea (Duftschmid, 1825)
Chrysolina suffriani (Fairmaire, 1859)
Chrysolina viridana (Kuster, 1844)
Subgenus Taeniochrysea
Chrysolina americana (Linnaeus, 1758)
Subgenus Taeniosticha
Chrysolina reitteri (Weise, 1884)
Subgenus Threnosoma
Chrysolina cribrosa (Ahrens, 1812)
Chrysolina fimbrialis (Kuster, 1845)
Chrysolina helopioides (Suffrian, 1851)
Chrysolina inflata (Weise, 1916)
Chrysolina joliveti Bechyné, 1950
Chrysolina obenbergeri Bechyné, 1950
Chrysolina obscurella (Suffrian, 1851)
Chrysolina osellai (Daccordi & Ruffo, 1979)
Chrysolina tagana (Suffrian, 1851)
Chrysolina timarchoides (Brisout, 1882)
Chrysolina weisei (Frivaldszky, 1883)
Subgenus Timarchida
Chrysolina deubeli (Ganglbauer, 1897)

See also
 List of Chrysolina species

References 

 Fauna europaea
 Biolib

External links 
 

Chrysomelinae
Chrysomelidae genera
Taxa named by Victor Motschulsky